Mercyhurst Lakers ice hockey may refer to either of the ice hockey teams that represent Mercyhurst University:

Mercyhurst Lakers men's ice hockey
Mercyhurst Lakers women's ice hockey